Rosa Torras (1 January 1895 – 23 August 1986) was a Spanish tennis player. She competed in the women's singles event at the 1924 Summer Olympics.

References

External links
 

1895 births
1986 deaths
Spanish female tennis players
Olympic tennis players of Spain
Tennis players at the 1924 Summer Olympics
Tennis players from Barcelona